The kkStB 6 was a class of 68 express passenger 4-4-0 locomotives of the  Imperial Royal Austrian State Railways (kaiserlich-königliche österreichische Staatsbahnen or kkStB).

History 
The kkStB 6 war the first design by Karl Gölsdorf in kkStB drawing office. Since the express train locomotives used in the 1890s were too weak due to increasing train weights, Gölsdorf designed the considerably more powerful 6 series as a compound locomotive to replace the kkStB 4. The boiler pitch was  higher on the 6 series compared to the 4. A total of 68 locomotives were delivered by Lokomotivfabrik Floridsdorf (24), Wiener Neustädter Lokomotivfabrik (20) and Lokomotivfabrik der StEG (24).

With the 6 series, the travel time between Vienna and Prague could be reduced from twelve to eight hours. The locomotives were also used on the Vienna–Eger, Prague–Linz and Vienna–Salzburg routes. They also hauled the Orient-Express, the Ostend-Vienna Express and the spa trains to Karlovy Vary.

After the First World War, 20 locomotives passed to the Federal Railways of Austria (Bundesbahnen Österreich, BBÖ).
28 locomotives went to the Czechoslovakian State Railways (ČSD) as their class 264.0.
The Polish State Railways (PKP) inherited 9 locomotives as class Pd12. The remaining locomotives were war losses or were eliminated before they were included in the series schemes of the various railway companies. The BBÖ retired its last locomotive in 1932, the ČSD its last in 1938.

References 

 
 
 
 
 
 
 
 
 

 
4-4-0 locomotives
2′B n2v locomotives
060
Floridsdorf locomotives
Wiener Neustädter locomotives
Lokomotivfabrik der StEG locomotives
Standard gauge locomotives of Austria
Passenger locomotives